Phacopsis lethariellae is a species of lichenicolous (lichen-dwelling) fungus in the family Parmeliaceae. It was formally described as a new species in 1995 by Josef Hafellner and Gerhard Rambold. It causes formations of galls, which also creates a torsion on the thallus. It has dark brown to black apothecia that are typically 0.3–0.5 mm in diameter, with a convex disc. Its ascospores are ellipsoid to ovoid, measuring 11–13 by 6–7 μm. The fungus, known to occur only in the Canary Islands, is named after the genus of its host.

References

Parmeliaceae
Fungi described in 1995
Fungi of the Canary Islands
Taxa named by Josef Hafellner